McKenzie Lake is a lake in geographic Pearce Township in the Unorganized North Part of Cochrane District in northeastern Ontario, Canada.

The lake has two unnamed inflows at the west and northeast. The primary outflow is an unnamed creek at the northwest which flows via Guilfoyle Creek, the Opasatika River, the Missinaibi River and the Moose River to James Bay.

See also
List of lakes in Ontario

References

Lakes of Cochrane District